The Collie Campbell Memorial Award was created in honour of Canadian Collie Campbell, who served as president of the International Curling Federation, now known as the World Curling Federation, from 1969 until his death in 1978.  It is presented to the male curler "who best displays the ideals of sportsmanship and skill" during the World Curling Championships.  The winner is selected by his fellow curlers in the tournament.

Winners

References

External links
World Curling Federation: Colin Campbell Award
 

Curling trophies and awards
Sportsmanship trophies and awards
Awards established in 1979
World Curling Federation